Karl Reid is the emeritus dean of the College of Engineering, Architecture & Technology, Oklahoma State University–Stillwater and Oklahoma State University–Tulsa, Oklahoma, United States, since 1986.  On October 25, 2010, he announced his retirement. His successor, Paul J. Tikalsky, assumed the position on July 1, 2012.  Reid was the Director of the Web-Handling Center at OSU, a leading research center on manufacturing products that use thin sheet (Web) material, e.g. paper, metal foil, diapers...

Background and career
He obtained his BS, MS, Mechanical Engineering, Oklahoma State University and Sc.D., MIT. Reid holds four patents in his field, one of which is for a lung ventilator that he developed.

References

External links
O-State Stories Oral History Collection

Oklahoma State University faculty
Oklahoma State University alumni
Massachusetts Institute of Technology alumni
Year of birth missing (living people)
Living people
American university and college faculty deans
20th-century American engineers
21st-century American engineers
American mechanical engineers
Engineering academics